Alias the Cat is a graphic novel by American cartoonist Kim Deitch, published by Pantheon Books in 2007. It originally appeared as a three-issue comic book in 2002 as The Stuff of Dreams from Fantagraphics Books.

The metafictional book stars Deitch himself and his best-known creation, Waldo the Cat. It's about a character named Alias the Cat who appeared in 1915 in a comic strip and a serial film, as well as in real life as a freedom-fighting superhero, but who mysteriously disappears. As Deitch researches the character, the story keeps getting more and more involved.

Synopsis

Characters

Kim DeitchThe cartoonist metafictionally appears himself as a character in the story. The opening portions of the book have the flavor of Harvey Pekar's autobiographical American Splendor, as Deitch details aspects of his and his wife's lives in a seemingly autobiographical manner.
Pam ButlerDeitch's wife and obsessive collector of cartoon cats of the 1920s and 1930s.
WaldoDeitch's best-known recurring character, a talking cartoon cat whom most people cannot see.

Publishing history
Originally Alias was published as a three-issue series of comics, called The Stuff of Dreams, published by Fantagraphics Books in 2002. It was collected by Pantheon Books in hardcover form in 2007.

Reception
When serialized as The Stuff of Dreams, the story won the Eisner Award for Best Single Issue or One-Shot in 2003.

Greg McEllhatton called Alias the Cat! one of the stronger pieces of metafiction he'd seen in comics.

See also

 The Boulevard of Broken Dreams

References

External links
 Product page at Random House's website

Works by Kim Deitch
Pantheon Books graphic novels
2007 graphic novels